Torvald Kvinlaug (13 July 1911 – 1 July 1997) was a Norwegian politician for the Christian Democratic Party.

Biography 
He was born in Liknes. He served as a deputy representative to the Norwegian Parliament from Vest-Agder during the terms 1961–1965, 1965–1969 and 1969–1973.

On the local level, he was a member of Kvinesdal municipality council from 1947 to 1971, serving as deputy mayor from 1961 to 1963. Following the 1975 elections, Faye became the first elected county mayor (fylkesordfører) of Vest-Agder. In 1979 he was succeeded by Niels-Otto Hægland from the same party.

References

1911 births
1997 deaths
Christian Democratic Party (Norway) politicians
Chairmen of County Councils of Norway
Deputy members of the Storting